Gordonville is the name of several towns in the United States:
Gordonville, Alabama
Gordonville, Missouri
Gordonville, Pennsylvania
Gordonville, Texas

See also
Gordonsville (disambiguation)